Gephyrella is a monotypic snout moth genus. It was described by Harrison Gray Dyar Jr. in 1914, and contains the species Gephyrella parsimonalis. It is found in Panama.

References

Chrysauginae
Monotypic moth genera
Moths of Central America
Pyralidae genera